Magnus Herseth (25 April 1892 – 13 September 1976), known as Max Herseth, was a Norwegian rower who competed in the 1912 Summer Olympics.

He was a crew member of the Norwegian boat that won the bronze medal in the coxed four, inriggers. He died on 13 September 1976.

References

External links
 
 profile

1892 births
1976 deaths
Norwegian male rowers
Olympic rowers of Norway
Rowers at the 1912 Summer Olympics
Olympic bronze medalists for Norway
Olympic medalists in rowing
Medalists at the 1912 Summer Olympics
Norwegian male speed skaters
20th-century Norwegian people